Euroflora is an exhibition of flowers and ornamental plants. It represents one of the main events that take place in the Mediterranean and in the world on research to plant hybridization, cut flowers, potted plants, arboriculture, gardening and landscaping.
It is organized by Genova Floralies with the support of municipality of Genoa.
It is an event recognized by Association Internationale des Producteurs Horticoles (AIPH) and it is part of  Association of International Floralies (AIF) founded in 2005 together with the Floralies of Ghent and Nantes.

History 
Euroflora takes place every five years (quinquennial), with the first edition in 1966. Among the main themes of the event is biodiversity.

Euroflora was designed inspired by the famous floralie of Ghent, thanks to the ingenious intuition of the President of the Ente Fiera di Genova Carlo Pastorino that involved the Genoese and Ligurian floriculturists in this ambitious project. The authorization for its development was granted on 27 August 1965 by Association Internationale des Producteurs Horticoles (AIPH), through its president Emile Debroise, who inserted it into the vast panorama of its events.
Many Italian floriculturists and botanical experts, but also many foreign exhibitors from countries of all world have presented their plants, flowers and trees at the Fiera di Genova, in over 100,000 square meters of covered pavilions, as well as in outdoor areas.

Euroflora 1966
Fiera di Genova, Genova, 30 April - 8 May 1966
In this inaugural edition they were also attendant the actress Grace Kelly, Princess of Monaco and Prince Rainier III of Monaco.

Euroflora 1971
Fiera di Genova, Genova, 17–25 April 1971

Euroflora 1976
Fiera di Genova, Genova, 24 April - 2 May 1976

Euroflora 1981
Fiera di Genova, Genova, 25 April - 3 May 1981

Euroflora 1986
Fiera di Genova, Genova, 25 April - 4 May 1986
The 1986 edition was the most successful with a total of 730,000 visitors. 250,000 visitors were present at the opening of the exhibition with over 260 exhibitors from 19 countries.
The President of the Italian Republic Sandro Pertini was present at this edition.

Euroflora 1991
Fiera di Genova, Genova, 20–28 April 1991
The President of the Italian Republic Francesco Cossiga was present at this edition.

Euroflora 1996
Fiera di Genova, Genova, 20–28 April 1996
The President of the Italian Republic Oscar Luigi Scalfaro together with his daughter was present at this edition.

Euroflora 2001
Fiera di Genova, Genova, 21 April - 1 May 2001

Euroflora 2006
Fiera di Genova, Genova, 21 April - 1 May 2006

Euroflora 2011
Fiera di Genova, Genova, 21 April - 1 May 2011

Euroflora 2018
Parchi di Nervi, Genova Nervi, 21 April - 6 May 2018

The total number of tickets sold was 246.095. Five days in April sold out: Sunday 22nd, Wednesday 25th, Saturday 28th, Sunday 29th and Monday 30th.
The estimate of total attendance is 285,000 presences. The number, in addition to tickets sold, takes into account free admissions for children up to 8 years, disabled people and their carers, service passes and accredited journalists.
Entrance fees in the Museums: 92,335 total attendance, of which 43,768 to Raccolte Frugone, 32,915 to the Gallery of Modern Art and 15.652 to the Wolfsoniana. The record day was 30 April with 7,581 entries.

On 26 April 2018, the Minister of Defense of the Italian Republic, Roberta Pinotti visited the event.
On 2 May 2018 The Senator Matteo Salvini, with the Mayor of Genoa, Marco Bucci and the President of the Liguria Region Giovanni Toti, visited the event.

Exhibitors: 250 among floriculturists, florists, floral decorators and designers. Foreign presences from: France, Spain, Taiwan, China, United States together with a representation of the Consular Corps with 56 countries present.

Euroflora 2022
Parchi di Nervi, Genova Nervi, 23 April - 8 May 2022
Due to the persistence of the COVID-19 pandemic, the event is postponed to 2022.

The next edition of Euroflora will take place from 23 April to 8 May 2022.
The estimate of total attendance is 300,000 presences. Over 100,000 tickets have already been sold.
On 22 April 2022, the Mayor of Genoa, Marco Bucci and the President of the Liguria Region, Giovanni Toti inaugurated the event together with the Member of the Chamber of Deputies, Edoardo Rixi and other representatives of the Italian institutions.
On 23 April 2022, the Prince Albert II of Monaco visits to Euroflora, together with the Mayor of Genoa, Marco Bucci and the President of the Liguria Region, Giovanni Toti, in memory of the first inaugural visit of the event in 1966 by his parents, the actress Grace Kelly, Princess of Monaco and Prince Rainier III of Monaco.

Euroflora 2025
Parco della Fiera di Genova, Genova

See also 
 Giardino all'italiana
 Italian Riviera
 Liguria
 List of botanical gardens in Italy
 The Parks of Genoa

References

Exhibitions in Italy
Parks in Liguria
Gardens in Italy by region
Geography of Liguria
Tourist attractions in Liguria